The 2014 Akron Zips football team represented the University of Akron in the 2014 NCAA Division I FBS football season. They were led by third-year head coach Terry Bowden and played their home games at InfoCision Stadium–Summa Field. They were members of the East Division of the Mid-American Conference. They finished the season 5–7, 3–5 in MAC play to finish in a tie for fourth place in the East Division.

Schedule

Roster

References

Akron
Akron Zips football seasons
Akron Zips football